The Centre on Conflict, Development and Peacebuilding is an interdisciplinary research centre at the Graduate Institute of International and Development Studies which is housed at the Maison de la paix in Geneva. The Centre is staffed by several prominent researchers such as: director Keith Krause, Mohamed Mahmoud Ould Mohamedou, Thomas J. Biersteker, Anna Leander, Jonathan Luke Austin,  and Jean-Louis Arcand.

Founding 
The Centre on Conflict, Development and Peacebuilding (CCDP) was founded in 2008 by Keith Krause, Thomas J. Biersteker, Ricardo Bocco and Gilles Carbonnier, following the merger of HEI and IUED into the Graduate Institute of International and Development Studies.

Expertise 
The Centre specifically focuses on research in the following fields:
 Peacebuilding, Armed violence reduction, reconciliation, and the transformation of conflict;
 Community Policing, and informal security provision, particularly in urban settings;
 Security sector reform;
 Critical security studies;
 Development, extractive industries and the political economy of violence.

External links 
 Centre on Conflict, Development and Peacebuilding official website

References 

Graduate Institute of International and Development Studies
Research institutes in Switzerland
Peace organisations based in Switzerland
Maison de la Paix
Organisations based in Geneva